Sandy Flat  is a historic locality on the Northern Tablelands in the New England region of New South Wales, Australia. This locality is situated on New England Highway and the former Main North Railway line about 20 kilometres south of Tenterfield.

Sandy Flat takes its name from a general description of the area. Nearby Bluff Rock is a commonly photographed landmark along the New England Highway.

History

The original inhabitants of the land were Aborigines of the Kamilaroi clan.

Early community life at Sandy Flat for generations centred on a school (1886–1965), a public hall, a church, a general store and during construction of the railway line during the 1880s the community also had its own hotel. The Main Northern Railway line to Jennings opened on 1 September 1886 and the station at Sandy Flat closed on 20 February 1975. Sandy Flat Post Office opened on 20 June 1887.

The Bluff River Rail Bridge at Sandy Flat, designed by John Whitton, is listed on the Register of the National Estate. When completed in 1886 it was the second longest timber truss bridge in Australia.

Remains of the Sandy Flat community comprises the remains of the former rail siding, a disused post office building and a modern New South Wales Rural Fire Service shed together with an information stand. There are some scattered agricultural properties in the surrounding area.

Sports
Apart from facilities for the more traditional sports such as tennis, cricket and football the Sandy Flat Rifle Range provided many hours of recreation for men around the time of World War I. The 1,000 yard range was opened in 1913 with a telephone connection and a substantial weather shelter for its sixty or so members.

Industries 
Local industries include merino sheep breeding and beef cattle farms.

Sandy Flat railway station

References

Further reading
Halliday, Ken, Call of the Highlands, Southern Cross Printery, Toowoomba, 1988
Tenterfield Tourism, Tenterfield: A Federation Town, ICP Craftpress, Stanthorpe, QLD

Towns in New South Wales
Towns in New England (New South Wales)